Yavgildino (Yawgilde) is a rural locality (a village) in Yavgildinsky Selsoviet, Karaidelsky District, Bashkortostan, Russia. The population was 453 as of 2010. There are 8 streets.

Geography 
Yavgildino is located 32 km west of Karaidel (the district's administrative centre) by road. Taykash is the nearest rural locality.

References 

Rural localities in Karaidelsky District